Rochester International Airport  is an international airport located seven miles (11 km) south of downtown Rochester in Olmsted County, Minnesota. It is the second-busiest airport in Minnesota. It used to be "Rochester Municipal Airport", its name before adding customs and immigration facilities specifically for Mayo Clinic purposes in 1995.

Airline service is currently provided by American Airlines, Delta Air Lines, and Sun Country Airlines (seasonally). Charter service is also occasionally offered by Sun Country Airlines on Boeing 737s. The airport has a large FedEx Express freight terminal and a general aviation terminal.

History
The original Rochester airport was founded in 1928 by the Mayo Foundation to bring patients to Mayo Clinic. It was in what is now southeast Rochester and occupied 285 acres (1.2 km2). The following year "Rochester Airport" was dedicated, and the Rochester Airport Company was founded as a subsidiary of the Mayo Foundation. Northwest Airlines began running Ford Trimotors to Rochester from St. Paul. Rochester was one of the first destinations from the Twin Cities in Northwest Airlines history, behind Chicago, Winnipeg, Green Bay, and Fargo.

In 1940, the runways were paved and more land was acquired, bringing the airport's area to 370 acres (1.5 km2). During World War II, the Army Air Corps conducted training operations from the airport. In 1945, the Mayo Foundation gave the airport to the city of Rochester, but the Rochester Airport Company continued to operate the field under an agreement with the city. The airport was renamed Lobb Field in 1952. In 1960, it was decided to replace Lobb Field with a new airport southwest of town because it could not be expanded to allow larger airliners and was too close to the urban area of Rochester. The original Rochester Airport closed in 1961.

Northwest and Braniff moved to the new airport in 1960, but Ozark's DC-3s stayed at Lobb until 1961; North Central Airlines arrived in 1968, and Braniff left around the same time. The first jets were Northwest 727s in 1965.

American Airlines began service to O'Hare International Airport in 1988. 1995 saw the addition of a United States Customs Service post and it became the Rochester International Airport. Trans World Airlines operated flights to St. Louis in early-2001, but these routes were dropped very soon due to the merger with American Airlines. On September 15, 2005, the primary runway was lengthened from 7,533' to 9,034 following a three-month closure for renovations; runway centerline and touchdown zone lighting were added. The change was made to allow large wide body aircraft, which had been weight-restricted upon departure.

In 1970, Imperial Airways offered scheduled helicopter service to Minneapolis–Saint Paul International Airport. On December 4, 1970, Imperial Airways announced it was canceling its scheduled helicopter flights in Minnesota, including from Minneapolis–St Paul to Rochester.

In 2020, the airport received a $2,479,991 CARES Act award.

2009 tarmac stranding incident 
The Rochester International Airport was the site of the six-hour 2009 tarmac stranding incident that made international news and resulted in the first fines ever imposed on airline carriers by the United States Department of Transportation for stranding passengers on a tarmac.

Future 
In March 2019, plans for construction of an additional gate and jet bridge were announced. The proposal for the addition came after a large increase in passengers the previous year and congestion. In July 2019, the Rochester Airport Commission began accepting bids for the jet bridge project. The commission also discussed repaving parts of runway 02/20 as well as additional dining and shopping options in the terminal. At the end of July 2019, the airport received $3.3 million in federal grants to improvements, including the jet bridge project and runway reconstruction.

In February 2020, the airport was awarded $750,000 by the United States Department of Transportation for attracting new service, with the federal grant's stated purpose being "revenue guarantee and marketing program to attract new service to Denver on United Airlines." Airport directors noted that the grant does not guarantee the new destination yet and also does not exclude possible other destinations.

Airlines and destinations

Airport directors are trying to get more service into Rochester. The directors have recently contacted the current providers, American and Delta, about adding more destinations, and have also contacted United and Frontier, to bring new nonstop destinations. On February 26, 2017, United announced it was adding three daily flights to Chicago–O'Hare beginning June 8. The new flight was to compete with existing service from American Airlines. United later added service to Denver however these services proved unsuccessful in the wake of the COVID-19 pandemic and were discontinued in late 2021 as United exited the Rochester market entirely.

In August 2012, just days after Allegiant Air announced flights between Rochester and Phoenix (Allegiant Air has since dropped its Rochester service altogether), the United States Department of Transportation gave the airport $500,000 and the city of Rochester gave the airport $250,000 to help recruit more airlines and non-stop destinations.

On May 31, 2018, Elite Airways announced that they would be launching service direct to Phoenix, Arizona, and St. Augustine, Florida, starting in July 2018. This service was to allow Mayo Clinic staff, patients, and families to easily move back and forth between Mayo's headquarters in Rochester and its other main facilities in the Phoenix and Jacksonville metropolitan areas. They ended the service on August 22, 2018, citing low bookings.

Cargo destinations

Top destinations

General aviation facilities
Rochester Aviation is the general aviation terminal at the airport. It is owned and operated by Hiawatha Aviation, Inc. The terminal provides line services, refueling services, and caters largely towards business aviation. On April 1, 2006, the ownership of Rochester Aviation was passed onto Regent Aviation of St. Paul. In November 2007, Regent Aviation in turn sold its ownership stake in Rochester's general aviation terminal to Signature Flight Support, a worldwide fixed-base operator provider. Aircraft rental and flight instruction at RST are available through Great Planes Aviation, with various aircraft providing flight instruction with a group of certified flight instructors. The airport is also home to the Southeastern Minnesota Flying Club, which has had a presence at both RST and its predecessor Lobb Field for over 50 years.

Access
Transportation to Rochester International Airport is available from downtown Rochester via $30 taxi or $15 shuttle service. Rochester Yellow Cab, Rochester Taxi, and Med-City Taxi service the airport with both cabs and shuttles. Uber, Lyft, and other ride share apps are also available. Ground transportation to and from MSP airport is also available. Rochester Public Transit does not serve the airport.

Accidents near RST
 On December 8, 1985, a Learjet 35 operated by Corporate Air Inc, a training flight, rolled inverted and crashed after a missed approach. All three occupants died.

References

External links

Airports in Minnesota
1928 establishments in Minnesota
Buildings and structures in Olmsted County, Minnesota
Transportation in Olmsted County, Minnesota
Airports established in 1928
Rochester, Minnesota